Corystes cassivelaunus, the masked crab, helmet crab or sand crab, is a burrowing crab of the North Atlantic and North Sea from Portugal to Norway, which also occurs in the Mediterranean Sea. The name "masked crab" derives from the patterns on the carapace which resemble a human face (a case of pareidolia), in a similar manner to heikegani. It is the only species in the genus Corystes.

C. cassivelaunus lives buried in sandy substrates, where it feeds on the infaunal invertebrates such as polychaete worms and bivalve molluscs. It uses its two antennae to form a breathing tube that allows oxygenated water down into the substrate. The chelipeds of males are much longer than the body, while those of females are only about as long as the carapace.

References

Crabs
Crustaceans of the Atlantic Ocean
Monotypic decapod genera
Taxa named by Louis Augustin Guillaume Bosc